Straszyn may refer to the following places in Poland:

Straszyn, Pomeranian Voivodeship
Straszyn, West Pomeranian Voivodeship